Leonardo Felipe Sampaio Santos (born 30 May 1994) is a Brazilian handball player for the Brazilian handball team.

He participated at the 2016 Summer Olympics in Rio de Janeiro, in the men's handball tournament.

References

External links

1994 births
Living people
Brazilian male handball players
Olympic handball players of Brazil
Handball players at the 2016 Summer Olympics
Brazilian expatriate sportspeople in Spain
Brazilian expatriate sportspeople in Romania
Expatriate handball players
Liga ASOBAL players
CB Ademar León players
People from Maringá
Sportspeople from Paraná (state)
21st-century Brazilian people